The accession of Moldova to the European Union (EU) is on the current agenda for future enlargement of the EU.

History

European perspective
The European Parliament passed a resolution in 2014 stating that "in accordance with Article 49 of the Treaty on European Union, Georgia, Moldova and Ukraine, as well as any other European country, have a European perspective and can apply for EU membership in compliance with the principles of democracy, respect for fundamental freedoms and human rights, minority rights and ensuring the rule of rights".

Membership application
After the outbreak of the 2022 Russian invasion in Ukraine, Maia Sandu signed on 3 March 2022 the application for EU membership, together with Igor Grosu, President of the Moldovan Parliament; and Natalia Gavrilița, Prime Minister of Moldova.

Questionnaire
On 11 April 2022, the Minister of Foreign Affairs and European Integration of Moldova Nicu Popescu received a questionnaire from the European Commission (EC) following a meeting with the European Commissioner for Neighbourhood and Enlargement Olivér Várhelyi as a result of Moldova's application for candidacy.
The response to the first part of the questionnaire was submitted back to the EC through the Delegation of the European Union to Moldova's head Janis Mazeiks by the Prime Minister of Moldova Natalia Gavrilița on 22 April, while the responses to the second part were submitted on 12 May 2022.

Recommendation
On 17 June 2022, the European Commission formally recommended that the European Council grant the Republic of Moldova the perspective to become a member of the European Union and candidate status for accession, with a number of conditions for the opening of accession negotiations.

Candidacy
On 23 June 2022, Moldova received the status of candidate together with Ukraine.  Both countries received candidate status under the commitment of structural reforms.  Moldova's structural reforms include:
 improving economic efficiency
 reducing corruption
 better enforcing property rights
 reducing the size of state-owned enterprises
 improving energy efficiency
 improving the labor market

Treaties

Stabilisation and Association Agreement

The EU Association Agreement (AA) was initialed on 29 November 2013 in Brussels. It was signed on 27 June 2014 and was being provisionally applied (in particular the DCFTA) starting 1 September 2014.

On 1 July 2016, the Association Agreement (AA) between the European Union and the Republic of Moldova fully came into force, following ratification by all 31 signatories.

The parties committed to co-operate and converge economic policy, legislation, and regulation across a broad range of areas, including equal rights for workers, the exchange of information and staff in the area of justice, the modernisation of Moldova's energy infrastructure, and access to the European Investment Bank. The parties committed to regular summit meetings, and meetings among ministers, other officials, and experts.

The Association Agreement commits Moldova to economic, judicial and financial reforms to converge its policies and legislation to those of the European Union.

The 30 parties are Moldova, the EU and Euratom and the 27 EU members.

Ratification

Notes

Malta
The ratification was performed in accordance with article 4(2)(b) of the Maltese European Union Act, which reads that:
"Provided that with regard to treaties and international conventions which Malta may accede to as Member State of the European Union, and treaties and international conventions which Malta is bound to ratify in its own name or on behalf of the European Community by virtue of its membership within the
European Union, these shall come into force one month following their being submitted in order to be discussed by the Standing Committee on Foreign and European Affairs."
As the treaty was submitted to the Standing Committee on Foreign and European Affairs on 21 July 2014, the treaty came into force as part of the Maltese legislation on 21 August 2014.

United Kingdom of Great Britain and Northern Ireland
The ratification was based on The European Union (Definition of Treaties) (Association Agreement) (Moldova) Order 2015, made in accordance with section 1(3) of the European Communities Act 1972, after having been approved by a resolution of each House of Parliament.

Application in the United Kingdom after Brexit
The agreement applied to the United Kingdom as an EU-member state until Brexit on 31 January 2020. During the transition period that followed Brexit, the agreement until 31 December 2020, the agreement still applied to the UK. The UK and Moldova announced on 8 October 2020 an agreement replacing the EU-Moldova Association Agreement between them, which was provisionally applied from 1 January 2021.

Free trade area
The agreement established a Deep and Comprehensive Free Trade Area (DCFTA) between the EU and Moldova, including "the removal of import duties for most goods traded between the EU and Moldova" and "broad mutual access to trade in services for both partners".

Programs

EU Programs

Past EU Programs

Defence

Accession to NATO
The accession of Moldova to NATO remains unlikely. Article 11 of the Constitution of Moldova states: "The Republic of Moldova proclaims its permanent neutrality. The Republic of Moldova does not allow the deployment of armed forces of other states on its territory." According to NATO, "Moldova is constitutionally neutral but seeks to draw closer to Euro-Atlantic standards and institutions. NATO fully respects Moldova's constitutional neutrality."

Major obstacles

 Level of poverty in Moldova
 Transnistria conflict
 Autonomous region of Gagauzia
 Geopolitical ramifications
 Brussels Requirements:
 improve economic efficiency
 reduce corruption
 better enforce property rights
 reduce the size of state-owned enterprises
 improve energy efficiency
 improve the labor market

Public opinion

Domestic
A poll in June 2018 found that 46% preferred that Moldova join the EU versus 36% that preferred to join the Eurasian Economic Union.
A March 2022 survey condected by Magenta Consulting found that, after president Maia Sandu announced that her government had officially submitted an application for membership of the European Union, 61% of Moldovans (40% 'totally', 21% 'rather') were in favour of EU membership, up from 52% before the start of the 2022 Russian invasion of Ukraine.

In May 2022, a poll in Moldova found that 56.1% supported EU membership.

EU

Negotiations
Moldova has not yet started the negotiation process.

Economy

Developmental aid

Euro adoption
Moldova is expected to have to adopt the euro and become a member of the Eurozone in the future if it joins the EU.

Travel

Schengen visa liberalisation

Unification of Romania and Moldova

There is some support for the unification of Moldova and Romania, which would incorporate the current territory of Moldova into Romania and thus into the EU. About 44% of the Moldovans that were polled in 2021 supported such a scenario.

Impact of joining

See also
Moldova-European Union relations
Moldova–European Union Association Agreement
Moldova–Romania relations
Association Trio 
Enlargement of the European Union
Future enlargement of the European Union
Accession of Ukraine to the European Union 
Georgia–European Union relations
Moldova–NATO relations

References

External links
europa.eu foreign relations Moldova-EU
Delegation of the European Commission to Moldova site
www.mfa.md - Ministry of Foreign Affairs and European Integration of Moldova RM-EU relations page
EU-Moldova Negotiations: what is to be discussed, what could be achieved? document

Moldova–European Union relations
Contemplated enlargements of the European Union